The .25 Stevens was an American rimfire rifle cartridge.
To differentiate from the related .25 Stevens Short it is sometimes also referred to as .25 Stevens Long.

Developed by J. Stevens Arms & Tool Company and Peters Cartridge Company, it was developed between 1898 and 1900; catalogs suggest it was introduced in 1898, but most sources agree on 1900. It was offered in the Crack Shot No. 15 rifle, which debuted in 1900. It was also available in the Stevens Favorite rifle, which was first released in 1894 and discontinued in 1935. It originally used a  black powder charge under a  slug; this was later replaced by Smokeless powder.

Some handguns were also chambered for .25 Stevens, most notably the Stevens-Lord single-shot pistols.

The round was available with either solid lead or hollow point bullets and developed a good reputation for small game (such as rabbit) and varmints.

Serving as the parent for the less-successful .25 Stevens Short and experimental Remington .267 Rimfire, it was dropped in 1942.

Notable handgun authority Elmer Keith lamented its demise and advocated its revival for use in revolvers.

References 

Pistol and rifle cartridges
Rimfire cartridges
Stevens Arms